So You Think You Can Dance, an American dance competition show, returned for its fifteenth season on Monday, June 4, 2018. The season's judge panel once again features series creator Nigel Lythgoe, as well as the return of ballroom expert Mary Murphy, and Vanessa Hudgens, while Season 4 runner-up Stephen "tWitch" Boss is the new fourth judge during the auditions and the live shows. Cat Deeley continues in her role as host for a fourteenth consecutive season. This is the last season to feature Hudgens as judge.

Auditions

Open auditions for season 15 were held in two cities beginning in March 2018. During the auditions, the judges were joined by special guest judge, Stephen "tWitch" Boss.

The Academy

Top 20 contestants
Below comprises those who have advanced into the initial top twenty dancers (ten male and ten female dancers), until this year's "twist" which ultimately cut the finalist roster going to the live shows in half.

Male Contestants

Female Contestants

Contestants

Top 10 contestants

Female contestants

Male contestants

Elimination chart

Contestants are listed in chronological order of elimination (TBD).

Performances

Top 10 Perform, Part 1 (August 6, 2018) 
 Group dance: Top 10: "Dream State" — Son Lux (Contemporary; Choreographer: Travis Wall)
 Judges: Nigel Lythgoe, Mary Murphy, Vanessa Hudgens, Stephen "tWitch" Boss

Top 10 Perform, Part 2 (August 13, 2018) 
 Group dance: Top 10: "Yummy" – Gwen Stefani ft. Pharrell Williams (Hip-hop; Choreographer: Luther Brown)
 Judges: Nigel Lythgoe, Mary Murphy, Vanessa Hudgens, Stephen "tWitch" Boss

Top 8 Perform (August 20, 2018) 
 Group dance:
 Top 8: "Runaway" – Nathan Lanier (Hip-hop; Choreographer: Christopher Scott)
 Top 4 Girls: "Wanderlust" – Empara Mi (Contemporary; Choreographer: Talia Favia)
 Top 4 Boys: "Juice" – Yo Gotti (Hip-hop; Choreographer: Luther Brown)
 Judges: Nigel Lythgoe, Mary Murphy, Vanessa Hudgens, Stephen "tWitch" Boss

 Solos:

Top 6 Perform (August 27, 2018) 
 Group dance:
 Top 6: "Spring 1" – Max Richter (Contemporary; Choreographer: Mia Michaels)
 Top 3 Girls: "Bump" – Trish (Hip-hop; Choreographer: Luther Brown)
 Top 3 Boys: "Violence Broken" – No Mono (Hip-hop; Choreographer: Christopher Scott)
 Judges: Nigel Lythgoe, Mary Murphy, Vanessa Hudgens, Stephen "tWitch" Boss

Top 4 Perform (September 3, 2018) 
 Judges: Nigel Lythgoe, Mary Murphy, Vanessa Hudgens, Stephen "tWitch" Boss

Solos:

 all top 4 contestants were safe from elimination on September 3, winner was declared the following week on September 10, 2018.

Ratings

U.S. Nielsen ratings

References

2018 American television seasons
Season 15